María Isabel Allende Bussi (born 18 January 1945) is a Chilean politician.

A member of the Socialist Party and daughter of former president of Chile Salvador Allende and Hortensia Bussi, Allende served as a deputy from 1994 to 2010 and in March 2010 she became a Senator for the Atacama Region. On 28 February 2014, she was selected as president of the Senate, as of 11 March 2014, making her the first woman president of the Senate in Chilean history.

Biography
She went to the Maisonette College, and unlike her sisters, was initially attracted to the Catholic Church and received her first communion. In 1962, at the age of 17, she began studying sociology, and joined the university's socialist brigade. Five years later she accompanied her father to the congress of the Socialist Party in Chile. 

On 11 September 1973, the day of the military coup led by General Augusto Pinochet, Isabel was the last person to enter the presidential palace. After the military began to bomb the presidential palace, and the outcome was already clear, her father ordered the women to leave. 

Isabel's father Salvador Allende, the first Marxist president elected in the Americas, and sitting president at the time of the coup, killed himself rather than surrender to coup plotters led by General Augusto Pinochet in 1973. The military coup launched a bloody 17-year dictatorship. Isabel obtained political asylum in Mexico, with her mother and her sister Beatriz, where she spent sixteen years in exile, before returning to Chile in 1989, in the final stretch of the military regime. 

Her first marriage, with Sergio Meza, did not last for long, but they had a son, Gonzalo. Gonzalo (1965-2010) was an activist in the "No" movement leading up to the 1988 plebiscite and a founder of the Party for Democracy. With her second husband, Romilio Tambutti, she has a daughter named Marcia.

Other members of the Allende family have played important roles in Chilean politics. Her niece Maya Fernández, also a member of the Socialist Party, is Minister of Defense under President of Gabriel Boric since March 2022. Gay rights activist Alejandro Fernández Allende is her nephew.

Political career
On returning to her homeland, Allende began a successful political career as a member of the Socialist Party of Chile. After Chile's return to democracy in 1990, she was elected to the Chamber of Deputies, serving as its President between 2003 and 2004, becoming the second woman to do so after Adriana Muñoz. 

Allende, along with Soledad Alvear and several other Senators, sponsored a bill to extend voting rights to Chileans living abroad. The right to vote from overseas was codified by Law No. 20.748, which allowed thousands of Chileans to vote in the 2020 national plebiscite and in presidential elections.

Among her principle successes, Allende has worked to reform Chile's divorce law; a law that allows disabled individuals to be judges and notaries; and a law permitting abortion on three grounds. She has also worked for the passage of bills on gender identity, the water code, and creation of a government service for [[biodiversity regions and environmental protection. She supports adhering to the Trans-Pacific partnership.

See also
Allende family
Pinochet dictatorship
History of Chile

References

External links
  (Spanish)

 Biography from the Chilean National Congress
  New York Times on exhumation of Salvador Allende

1945 births
Living people
People from Santiago
Isabel
Chilean people of Basque descent
Chilean people of Italian descent
Socialist Party of Chile politicians
Presidents of the Chamber of Deputies of Chile
Deputies of the XLIX Legislative Period of the National Congress of Chile
Deputies of the L Legislative Period of the National Congress of Chile
Deputies of the LI Legislative Period of the National Congress of Chile
Deputies of the LII Legislative Period of the National Congress of Chile
Presidents of the Senate of Chile
Senators of the LIII Legislative Period of the National Congress of Chile
Senators of the LIV Legislative Period of the National Congress of Chile
Senators of the LV Legislative Period of the National Congress of Chile
Senators of the LVI Legislative Period of the National Congress of Chile
Women legislative speakers
20th-century Chilean women politicians
21st-century Chilean women politicians
Women members of the Chamber of Deputies of Chile
Women members of the Senate of Chile
Chilean agnostics
University of Chile alumni
Academic staff of the University of Chile
National Autonomous University of Mexico alumni
Daughters of national leaders
Children of presidents of Chile
Chilean exiles